Greg Clarke is an Australian former professional rugby league footballer who played in the 1990s. He played for Illawarra and South Sydney in the NSWRL/ARL competition. Clarke also played for Halifax in the Super League

Playing career
Clarke made his first grade debut for Illawarra in round 18 of the 1993 NSWRL season against Manly at Brookvale Oval. Clarke would make four appearances for Illawarra over two seasons. In 1995, he joined South Sydney and played 13 games for the club before departing at the end of the 1996 season. In 1997, he joined Super League side Halifax where he played three games.

References

South Sydney Rabbitohs players
Illawarra Steelers players
Halifax R.L.F.C. players
Australian rugby league players
Rugby league wingers
1973 births
Living people